Tulay-e Bala (also Romanized as Ţūlāy-e Bālā; also known as Ţīūlā-ye Bālā) is a village in Eshkevar-e Sofla Rural District, Rahimabad District, Rudsar County, Gilan Province, Iran. At the 2006 census, its population was 134, in 52 families.

References 

Populated places in Rudsar County